Munchi may refer to:
a historical name for the Tiv people
Munchi (DJ)